The 3rd Guards Volnovakha Red Banner Order of Suvorov Motor Rifle Division (Military Unit Number 61415) was a division of the Soviet Army from 1957 to around 1992. It traced its history from the highly decorated 3rd Guards Rifle Division of World War II. 3rd Guards Rifle Division was formed from the 153rd Rifle Division.

Division history

Combat history from 22 June to 20 September 1941

In August 1940, by an Order of the People's Commissar of Defence of the USSR, the 153rd Rifle Division was formed in the city of Sverdlovsk. The division was later renamed the 3rd Guard Rifle Volnovakha Red Banner Suvorov Division. From August 1940 through June 1941, the division was engaged in combat training in the Kamyshlovsky camps of the Ural Military District.

In the first half of June 1941, by the order of the People's Commissar of Defense of the USSR, the division, as a part of the Second Strategic Echelon, was transferred to Vitebsk. By 22 June—the day of the German attack on the Soviet Union—the first three echelons (troop trains?) had already arrived to Vitebsk. The full complement of the division arrived to Vitebsk on 27 June. Upon arriving to Vitebsk, the division was manned to peacetime standards (6,000 soldiers and officers). Due to the declaration of war, the division was urgently staffed with personnel and supplied with additional weapons and materiel over the period of 22–27 June. The mobilized personnel arriving to the division's camps were often under-supplied, but over the course of the week the division became fairly battle-ready.

While the staffing of the division was still in progress, on 26 June, parts of it assumed a defensive position on a broad front along the Gnezdilovichi–Kholm–sovkhoz Khodtsy–Moshkany–Burdeli–station of Krynki line. At the same time, the division's advance detachments reached the area of Ulla-2 (435th Rifle Regiment), Beshankovichy (Reconnaissance Battalion), Verkhovye (666th Rifle Regiment), and Syanno (505th Rifle Regiment). On 5 July, the advance units along these lines clashed with large mechanized forces of the enemy which were breaking through to Vitebsk. On 7 July, the battle reached the main division lines in the areas of Gnezdilovichi, Shchikotovshchina, Pavlovichi, and sovkhoz Khodtsy. Large German motorized and tank forces, expanding their offensive, attempted to break through to the city of Vitebsk along the Beshenkovichi-Vitebsk highway, and on 7 July, reached the defence division line. After the day of fierce fighting, the division stopped the enemy's advance to the city along the highway and inflicted heavy losses. The German units, waging battles with the defending divisional forces, launched another offensive towards Vitebsk both along the Polotsk–Vitebsk and the Syanno—Bogushevsk highways, thus bypassing the division from north and south. On 8 July, due to the emerging threat of the entrapment by the enemy, the division partially re-grouped its forces, and took up defensive positions at the Gnezdilovichi–Kholm–sovkhoz Khodtsy–Moshkany–Shchemilovka line.

The battles were extremely fierce. The Germans repeatedly tried to break through the division's defensive line, but after having achieved no success and sustaining heavy losses in men and materiel, ceased their attempts at the head-on attack. After breaking through the defences on the right and left, a large force of infantry and tanks began to bypass the division from the north and south. Continuing the offensive north and south of the defending division, by the end of 10 July, the German forces broke through the Gorodok–Vitebsk and Polotsk–Vitebsk highways and captured the western part of Vitebsk, thus reaching the western coast of the Zapadnaya Dvina River. The German mechanized troops pushed past the division's flanks and launched an offensive towards Smolensk.

From 11 July, the division was surrounded near the villages of Popovka, Karpovichi, and Krynki, located respectively 8, 14, and 22 km south-east of Vitebsk. By the morning of 17 July, the division's main forces reached the area of Sleptsy, Loguny, and Karoli, located respectively 17, 14 and 18 km south-west of a major inhabited locality of Liozno (Vitebsk Oblast). Until the end of 5 August, the 153rd Infantry Division was trying to break out of the encirclement. By August, of its original complement of 6,000 only about 1,000 soldiers and officers remained.

From 6 to 22 August the division conducted combat operations on the east bank of the Dnieper River, as well as attempted to expand its foothold on the west coast in the area of Ratchino, Lyakhovo, and Golovino. From 22 August to 6 September, the division conducted warfare in the area of Height 249.9 on the east bank of the Dnieper, and then on the west coast. From 6 to 20 September, the division was in the 20th Army reserve and then in the Stavka Supreme Main Command reserve while it was staffed to standard in Kalinin.

On 18 September, by the Order #308 of the People's Commissar of Defence, the 153rd Rifle Division was renamed the 3rd Guards Rifle Division.

Fighting divisions from 20 September 1941 to the summer of 1943
From 20 September to 9 November, the division led military operations as a part of the 54th Army of the Leningrad Front in the area of Mga and Sinyavino. From 10 to 14 November, the division relocated to the left flank of the army, south of the city of Volkhov. From 15 November to 28 December the division conducted combat operations near Volkhov and then pursued the enemy to the station of Pogostye.

In summer 1942, the division added staff, and then was made a part of the Stavka reserve.

At the end of August - September 1942, the division took part in the Sinyavino Offensive of the Volkhov Front.

In early December 1942, the division was withdrawn from the Stavka reserve and transferred under the 2nd Guards Army of the Stalingrad Front. During winter 1942, the division completed a difficult forced march, passing 200 to 280 km from the discharge point to the assembly areas. From 15 to 31 December 1942, the division engaged in active combat operations near Stalingrad.

During the Stalingrad strategic offensive, on the threshold of the Myshkova River, the division, as a part of the 2nd Guards Army, played a decisive role in repelling the enemy's Kotelnikovo group attack, and on 24 December it started the offensive itself and forced the enemy to withdraw to the south. Continuing the offensive toward Rostov, the troops of the 2nd Guards Army liberated Novocherkassk on 13 February 1943, and three days later reached the Mius River, where the enemy's resistance forced them to take defensive positions.

Fighting from the summer of 1943 to May 1945
In August–September 1943, the 3rd Guards Division took part in the Donbas strategic offensive operation. The division liberated the inhabited localities of Bolshoy Tokmak (on 20 September 1943) and Volnovakha (on 10 September 1943). By the order of VGK, the 3rd Guards Rifle Division (as well as 11th Guards Cavalry Division, 5th Motor Rifle Division, and 12th Motor Rifle Division, 5th and 12th Guards Motorized Brigades, 5th and 6th Guards Motorized Brigades, and 65th Tank Brigade) was named "Volnovakha".

In late September, during the Melitopol Offensive, the divisional forces reached the lower course of the Dnieper and liberated Kakhovka on the coast of the Black Sea (on 2 November 1943). In December, as a part of the 4th Ukrainian Front, the divisional forces eliminated the enemy's foothold on the left bank of the Dnieper (in the area of Kherson) after a stubborn battle. In February 1944, the army was transferred to the area of Perekop isthmus, and in April–May it took part in the Crimean strategic operation, resulting in the liberation of Yevpatoriya on 13 April 1944, and, together with other forces of the 4th Ukrainian Front and the Black Sea Fleet, Sevastopol on 9 May. In May–June, the 2nd Guards Army was relocated to the area of cities of Dorogobuzh and Yelnya. From 20 May, it was in the Stavka reserve, and on July 8 it was included in the 1st Baltic Front. In July, during the Šiauliai Offensive, the division countered the enemy's strikes to the west and northwest of Šiauliai. In October, it participated in the Memel Offensive. On 20 December, it was reassigned to the 3rd Belorussian Front. In January–April 1945, during the East Prussian Offensive, it broke the long-term defences and eliminated, in conjunction with other troops, encircled German forces southwest of Koenigsberg and the Sambia group.

Postwar

The 3rd Guards Rifle Division was in the Voronezh Military District with 11th Guards Rifle Corps in 1945-6, and later in 1955 and 1957. Feskov 2014/Holm say the division became 3rd Guards Motor Rifle Division on 25 June 1957 at Klaipėda. In the 1980s, the division became the 3rd Guards Motor Rifle Division for Coastal Defence on 12 October 1989 and transferred to the Baltic Fleet. Prior to that time it had been subordinated to the Baltic Military District. On 1 September 1993 the division was disbanded.

Assignments 
 Western Special Military District, 22nd Army, 62nd Rifle Corps (from mid-June to July 1941)
 Western Front, 20th Army (July - early August 1941)
 Western Front, 16th Army (Soviet Union) (August - early September 1941)
 Western Front, reserve of 20 Army (from 6 to 20 September 1941)
 Stavka Reserve (20 September - early October 1941)
 Leningrad Front, 54th Army (c (no later) 1 October 1941 to (no earlier than that date) July 1, 1942). Since February 1942 in the 4th Guards Rifle Corps.
 Volkhov Front, 2nd Guards Army, 6th Guards Rifle Corps (August - 1 October 1942)
 Don Front - 15 December 1942.
 Stalingrad Front 2nd Guards Army - from 15 to 31 December 1942.
 Southern Front, 2nd Guards Army 13th Guards Rifle Corps - from 1 January to 20 October 1943.
 4th Ukrainian Front, 2nd Guards Army 13th Guards Rifle Corps - 20 October 1943
 4th Ukrainian Front, 2nd Guards Army 13th Guards Rifle Corps – on 8 July 1944.
 1st Baltic Front, 2nd Guards Army 13th Guards Rifle Corps – 8 July to 20 December 1944.
 3rd Belorussian Front, 2nd Guards Army 13th Guards Rifle Corps – from 20 December 1944
 3rd Belorussian Front, Samland Group of Forces, 2nd Guards Army, 11th Guards Rifle Corps – on 1 April 1945

Division units

On 5 July 1941 
 435th Rifle Regiment
 505th Rifle Regiment
 666th Rifle Regiment
 122nd Separate Artillery Battalion
565th Light Artillery Regiment
 581st Howitzer Artillery Regiment
 150th Separate Anti-Tank Battalion
 460th Separate Anti-Aircraft Artillery Battalion
 238th Separate Reconnaissance Battalion
 208th Separate Sapper Battalion
 297th Separate Communications Battalion
 362nd Separate Medical-Sanitary Battalion
 7th Separate Chemical Defense Company
 193rd Auto Transport Company
 Field bakery and the divisional veterinary hospital.

In December 1942 
 5th Guards Rifle Regiment
 9th Guards Rifle Regiment
 13th Guards Rifle Regiment (see :ru:13-й гвардейский стрелковый полк)
 22nd Guards Artillery Regiment
 11th Guards Mortar Battalion
 15th Guards Mortar Battalion
 10th Guards Sapper Battalion
 3rd Guards Battalion

Commanders 
The following officers commanded the first formation of the 153rd Rifle Division and the 3rd Guards Rifle Division:

Colonel Nikolai Gagen (16 July 1940 – 18 December 1941; promoted to major general on 9 November 1941)
Colonel Anatoly Krasnov (19 December 1941 – 8 March 1942)
Major General Nikolay Martynchuk (9 March – 17 October 1942) 
Colonel Kantemir Tsalikov (18 October 1942 – 20 May 1944; promoted to major general 27 November 1942)
Colonel Leonty Karida (21 May – 28 June 1944)
Colonel Grigory Polishchuk (29 June 1944 – after 9 May 1945; promoted to major general 5 May 1945)

Awards 

18 September 1941 - the 153rd Rifle Division received the name:3rd Guards Rifle Division '.
10 September 1943 - The division given the name 'Volnovakha.
? ? 194? year - the division was awarded Order of the Red Banner
? ? 194? year - the division was awarded Order of Suvorov

Notes

References 
 General Staff. Military-scientific management. Collection of military documents of the German-Soviet War. Issue 32. - Moscow: Military Publishing House of the Ministry of Defense of the USSR, 1957.
 Station, Benedict Timofeevich, "Divo-Division". - Ekaterinburg, Argo, 1995. 126 p.
 Stadnyuk, Ivan Fotievich, War: Roman. - Moscow: Military Publishing, 1987. - "Library Series"

External links 
 Library Mikhail Grachev
 Genealogy Forum
 Oksana Korneva. Historian - Genealogy.
 Annex to the site MO "60 years of the Great Victory"
 Vladimir Martov. Belarusian Chronicle, 1941
 Do not forget!
 OI Nuzhdin. Ural State University. Nevelsk defensive operations of 22nd Army
 Military-patriotic club "Memory" at Voronezh State University

003
Military units and formations established in 1957
Military units and formations disestablished in 1993
Wikipedia articles needing cleanup after translation from Russian
1957 establishments in the Soviet Union
1993 disestablishments in Russia